This is a family tree of the Kings of Poland.
a

 king of Polnd
 high duke
 duke

Poland, Kings of
 Family tree